Razor Ramon or Scott Hall (1958–2022) was an American professional wrestler.

Razor Ramon may also refer to:

 Rick Bognar (1970–2019), Canadian wrestler, portrayed Hall's "Razor Ramon" gimmick for a short-lived 1996 revival; also known as "Fake Razor Ramon"
 Masaki Sumitani (born 1975), Japanese comedian and wrestler, who performed under the name Razor Ramon HG (aka Razor Ramon Hard Gay)
 Makoto Izubuchi (born 1974), Japanese comedian and wrestler, who performed under the name Razor Ramon RG (aka Razor Ramon Real Gay)